The Death of Adam is the debut studio album by American hip hop producer and rapper 88-Keys. Released on November 11, 2008, the album features guest appearances by Kanye West, Kid Cudi, J*Davey, Redman, Bilal, Phonte of Little Brother, and alternative rock group Shitake Monkey.

Concept
The album tells the story of an investigation surrounding the death of a man named Adam who was murdered in his Harlem loft apartment. During a recent interview in regards to the album's concept 88' stated:
The story is told instrumentally, while the featured artists help get the story across. 88' has described that his inspiration for the project derived from the thought, "What gives me pleasure?" 

Aside from tracks, the album's investigative story is told through visual means, particularly DCN 27 News pieces that were distributed on multiple video-sharing sites. In the faux news bulletins, local news reporter Chip Adams interviews various artists who apparently knew Adam to a certain extent and provide their feedback on his death.
The viral series includes cameos by Q-Tip, Consequence, Kid Cudi and Shitake Monkey.

The album's lead single, "Stay Up! (Viagra)", features 88's executive producer of the project, Kanye West:

Track listing

Samples
"Nice Guys Finish Last"
"It's Too Late to Be Nice to Her Now" by Townsend, Townsend, Townsend and Rogers
"Stay Up! (Viagra)"
"All Night Loving" by Imagination (band)
"(Awww Man) Round 2?"
"Now Is the Time to Say Goodbye" by Freda Payne
" Dirty Peaches" 
"The Note You Never Wrote" by Wings
" Burning Bush"
"Fire" by Temptations
" Ho Is Short For Honey" 
"Mrs Vandebilt" by Wings
"M.I.L.F."
"Mother Beautiful" by Sly & the Family Stone

Hardware assembly
 Akai MPC3000 (sampling workstation)
 AKG C 414B-ULS (microphone)
 Rhodes Jazz Bass (keyboard)
 Yamaha Motif 6 (keyboard)
 Numark DM1180 (mixer)
 Roland VS-2480 (digital studio workstation)
 Samson Servo 150 (amplifier)
 Tascam CD-RW700 (CD burner)
 Technics SL-1200MK2 (turntable)
 SB-A26 (3-way cabinet speakers)

References

External links
 Album Snippet

2008 albums
Albums produced by Kanye West
Concept albums
88-Keys albums
Albums produced by 88-Keys
Decon albums